Nectria ramulariae is a plant pathogenic fungus.

References

External links

Fungal plant pathogens and diseases
ramulariae
Fungi described in 1818